Kikue (written: 菊栄) is a feminine Japanese given name. Notable people with the name include:

, Japanese educator
, Japanese activist, writer, socialist, and feminist

Japanese feminine given names